The 2019–20 Harvard Crimson men's basketball team represent Harvard University in the 2019–20 NCAA Division I men's basketball season. The Crimson, led by 13th-year head coach Tommy Amaker, play their home games at the Lavietes Pavilion in Boston, Massachusetts as members of the Ivy League.

Previous season
The Crimson finished the 2018–19 season 19–12 overall, 10–4 in Ivy League play, finishing as co-regular season champions, alongside Yale. In the Ivy League tournament, they defeated Penn in the semifinals, before losing to Yale in the championship game. As a regular season league champion who failed to win their league tournament, they received an automatic bid to the NIT, where they defeated Georgetown in the first round, before falling to NC State in the second round.

Roster

Schedule and results

|-
!colspan=12 style=| Non-conference regular season

|-
!colspan=9 style=| Ivy League regular season

|-
!colspan=12 style=| Ivy League tournament
|-

|-

Source

References

Harvard Crimson men's basketball seasons
Harvard Crimson
Harvard Crimson men's basketball
Harvard Crimson men's basketball
Harvard Crimson men's basketball
Harvard Crimson men's basketball